A Golden Dragon is a popular motif that is mostly associated with Chinese culture, but can also be found in Western cultures, it can refer to several items:

Asian arowana, also known as the golden dragon fish
Der goldene Drache, an opera by Péter Eötvös
Domain of the Golden Dragon, an unofficial United States Navy certificate given for crossing of the 180th Meridian (International Date Line)
Golden Dragon (company), a China-based manufacturer of buses and light vans
Golden Dragon F.C., a football club in Sierra Leone
Golden Dragon massacre, a crime at a restaurant called "Golden Dragon" in San Francisco
Golden Dragon Restaurant (San Francisco)
Golden Dragon, Silver Snake, a kung-fu film
Gold dragon (Dungeons & Dragons), a monster in the game Dungeons & Dragons
Gulden Draak, a Dutch ale
King Long, a China-based manufacturer of buses and light vans, known as Jīnlóng Kèchē (金龙客车) lit. “Golden Dragon Bus” in Chinese
Higer Bus, also known as Sūzhōu Jīnlóng (苏州金龙) in Chinese
Dave Morris (writer)#Golden Dragon series
Nanjing Golden Dragon Bus - Nanjing, China based manufacturer of buses and light vans